As of 2012, 21.4% of the population in San Francisco was of Chinese descent, and there were at least 150,000 Chinese American residents. The Chinese are the largest Asian American subgroup in San Francisco. San Francisco has the highest percentage of residents of Chinese descent of any major U.S. city, and the second largest Chinese American population, after New York City. The San Francisco Area is 7.9% Chinese American, with many residents in Oakland and Santa Clara County. San Francisco's Chinese community has ancestry mainly from Guangdong province, China and Hong Kong, although there is a sizable population of ethnic Chinese with ancestry from other parts of mainland China and Taiwan as well.

History

The Chinese arriving in San Francisco, primarily from the Taishan and Zhongshan regions as well as Guangdong province of mainland China, did so at the height of the California Gold Rush, and many worked in the mines scattered throughout the northern part of the state. Chinatown was the one geographical region deeded by the city government and private property owners which allowed Chinese people to inherit and inhabit dwellings. The majority of these Chinese shopkeepers, restaurant owners, and hired workers in San Francisco Chinatown were predominantly Hoisanese and male . Many Chinese found jobs working for large companies, most famously as part of the Central Pacific on the Transcontinental Railroad. Other early immigrants worked as mine workers or independent prospectors hoping to strike it rich during the California Gold Rush.

Although many of the earlier waves of Chinese immigration were predominantly men searching for jobs, Chinese women also began making the journey towards the United States. The first known Chinese woman to immigrate was Marie Seise who arrived in 1848 and worked in the household of Charles V. Gillespie. Within a matter of months of Seise's arrival to the West Coast, the rush for gold in California commenced which brought a flooding of prospective miners from around the globe. Among this group were Chinese, primarily from the Guangdong Province, most of whom were seafarers who had already established Western contacts. “Few women accompanied these early sojourners, many of whom expected to return from after they made their fortune.”

Although the oceanic voyage to the United States offered new and exciting opportunities, dangers also loomed for women while traveling and many were discouraged from making the trip due to the harsh living conditions. Oceanic voyages with Chinese immigrants boarded the Pacific Mail Steamship Company and Canadian Pacific Steamship Company. Chinese immigrants would have to ride in the steerage where food was stored. Many were given rice bowls to eat during the voyage. In 1892, a federal law passed to ensure immigrants who were on board, needed a certificate. Due to tight arrangements, unhygienic situations and scarcity in food, this led to health degradation. Many immigrants were unable to board these voyages due to the Geary Act of 1892 which blocked the reunion of immigrants in America with their families not with them. Many diseases found through these voyages were Hookworm Yersinia pestis which contributed greatly to the Bubonic Plague.

“During the Gold Rush era, when Chinese men were a common sight in California, Chinese women were an oddity” and in urban spaces were rarely seen in public. Unlike the rural areas, Chinatown afforded few opportunities for women to come into contact with the larger society.” Simultaneously, Chinese women also participated in urban sex work, which resulted in local laws like one passed in April 1854 that sought to shut down "houses of ill-fame," not racialized in name but practically deployed to "[single] out Mexican and Chinese houses of ill fame, starting with Charles Walden's Golden Rule House on Pacific Street and moving on to establishments run by Ah-Choo, C. Lossen, and Ah Yow."

With national unemployment in the wake of the Panic of 1873, racial tensions in the city boiled over into full blown race riots. Like much of San Francisco during these times, a period of criminality ensued in some Chinese gangs known as tongs, which were onto smuggling, gambling and prostitution. In response to the violence, the Consolidated Chinese Benevolent Association or the Chinese Six Companies, which evolved out of the labor recruiting organizations for different areas of Guangdong province, was created as a means of providing a unified voice for the community. The heads of these companies were the leaders of the Chinese merchants, who represented the Chinese community in front of the business community as a whole and the city government. Numerous white citizens defended the Chinese community, among them Pastor Franklin Rhoda whose numerous letters appeared in the local press. By the early 1880s, the population had adopted the term Tong war to describe periods of violence in Chinatown, the San Francisco Police Department had established its so-called Chinatown Squad. The anti-immigrant sentiment became law as the United States Government passed the Chinese Exclusion Act of 1882 – the first immigration restriction law aimed at a single ethnic group. This law, along with other immigration restriction laws such as the Geary Act, greatly reduced the number of Chinese people allowed into the country and the city, and in theory limited Chinese immigration to single men only. Exceptions were granted to the families of wealthy merchants, but the law was still effective enough to reduce the population of the neighborhood to an all-time low in the 1920s. The neighborhood was completely destroyed in the 1906 earthquake that leveled most of the city. One of the more successful sergeants of Chinatown Squad, Jack Manion, was appointed in 1921 and served for two decades.  From 1910 to 1940, Chinese immigrants were detained at the Angel Island immigration station in the San Francisco Bay. To be permitted entry to the United States, thousands of mostly Chinese immigrants crossing the Pacific to San Francisco had to enter through the gauntlet of Angel Island, and were detained for months in a purgatory of isolation. Some spent years on the island waiting for entry to the U.S. The exclusion act was repealed during World War II under the Magnuson Act, in recognition of the important role of China as an ally in the war, although tight quotas still applied. The Chinatown Squad was finally disbanded in August 1955 by police chief George Healey, upon the request of the influential Chinese World newspaper, which had editorialized that the squad was an "affront to Americans of Chinese descent".

Many working-class Hong Kong Chinese immigrants began arriving in Chinatown in large numbers in the 1960s, and despite their status and professions in Hong Kong, had to find low-paying employment in restaurants and garment factories in Chinatown because of limited English fluency.  An increase in Cantonese-speaking immigrants from Hong Kong and Guangdong has gradually led to the replacement of the Taishanese (Hoisanese) dialect with the standard Cantonese dialect.

The Golden Dragon massacre occurred in 1977.

In the Sunset District in western San Francisco, a demographic shift began in the late 1960s and accelerated from the 1980s as Asian immigration to San Francisco increased dramatically. Much of the original, largely Irish American population of the Sunset moved to other neighborhoods and outlying suburban areas, although there is still a significant Irish American and Irish minority in the neighborhood. Informal Chinatowns have emerged on Irving Street between 19th Avenue and 26th Avenue as well as on the commercial sections of Taraval Street and Noriega Street west of 19th Avenue. About half of the Sunset District's residents are Asian American, mostly of Chinese birth and descent. The immigrants in the Sunset District were both Mandarin- and Cantonese-speaking.

With the rise of the technology industry in Silicon Valley, many immigrants from Mainland China and Taiwan moved to the San Francisco Area.  Many of them (particularly the Mandarin-speaking group) reside in the South Area cities of Cupertino, Sunnyvale, Santa Clara, San Jose, and Fremont.

Geography
Chinatowns in San Francisco:
 Chinatown, San Francisco
 Clement Street Chinatown, San Francisco, the "Second Chinatown"
 Irving Street Chinatown, San Francisco, the "Third Chinatown"
 Noriega Street Chinatown, San Francisco, the "Fourth Chinatown"

Chinatowns around San Francisco:
 Chinatown, Oakland
 Chinatown, San Jose, California 
 Milpitas Square, a Chinese shopping center in Milpitas, California

Cultural institutions
The Chinese Culture Center, a community-based, non-profit organization, is located between Chinatown and the Financial District in San Francisco.

The Chinese Historical Society of America, since 1963, is a non-profit, and the first organization established in the US to preserve, promote and present the history, heritage, culture and legacy of Chinese in America through exhibitions, education, and research; the Museum is located in San Francisco's original Chinatown on Clay Street.

Healthcare

Prior to health care 
According to "Handbook of Asian American Health" by Grace J. Yoo, the late 19th century was a period of major epidemics in San Francisco, which included outbreaks such as the bubonic plague, smallpox, and cholera. These diseases were commonly found among the poor and working classes. At the time, many believed in the miasma theory, or the spreading of disease due to "breathing sick air", rather than the now widely accepted germ theory. "In 1876, the Chinese were blamed as the source of the disease because of the unsanitary conditions of Chinatown." The area was unsanitary and overpopulated because the city's Chinese population was discriminated against, as Americans saw them as competition for work. This sentiment withheld services, such as access to healthcare or physicians, and property rights from the Chinese, causing them to cluster within Chinatown.

Struggles to establish health care 
Before the Chinese had any particular health care system for their community, all of them had to go through the following barriers: they had to walk a very long distance to receive any medical attention at a hospital, and they were denied coverage due to unaffordable rates of the services provided by the hospitals. Instead most Chinese relied on "folk healer" than on western medicine. The "Folk Healers" were those that provided Chinese traditional medicine to the Chinese community in San Francisco Chinatown. Therefore, many Chinese did not bother to go to the hospital unless it was a crisis.

First medical facility: Tung Wah Dispensary 
The first medical care place in San Francisco Chinatown was the Tung Wah Dispensary. It was provided by the Chinese Six Companies, and it was built in 1900 on 828 Sacramento Street. The dispensary was named after the Tung Wah Group of Hospitals in Hong Kong, and it housed 25 beds, provided both western and Chinese medicine, free or to low cost care to patients, and its staff was volunteers from the community and physicians from outside of the community. Of those physicians three were American physicians and the rest were Chinese American physicians who helped with the Chinese medicine and translating from Chinese to English for the American physicians.

Natural disaster led to the first modern hospital 
In 1906, due to the great earthquake in San Francisco, the Tung Wah Dispensary was destroyed but was rebuilt in Trenton Alley. However, with the many injuries due to the natural disaster, a lot more Chinese patients needed medical attention, and the dispensary was beginning to overflow with patients. Therefore, they decided to expand the dispensary to a modern hospital. In order to build the modern hospital they needed to make $200,000, so they began to have Chinese pageants that helped to contribute the donations from the Chinese Americans and Americans. So, when they got they collected the $200,000, they finally got permission from the San Francisco Board of Supervisors to build the Hospital, and in two years the construction was in underway. By April 18, 1925 the San Francisco Chinese Hospital (東華醫院) in the San Francisco Chinatown was established. It is the only Chinese-language hospital in the United States. The Asian Aids Project (AAP) was started in the 1987, it is made to help them fight the AIDS epidemic in the Asian Community including the Chinese Americans.

Education

In San Francisco:
  The Chinese American International School, Cumberland Chinese School, North Valley Chinese School, Mei Jia Chinese Learning Center, and Alice Fong Yu Alternative School are located in San Francisco.

Around San Francisco:

 Palo Alto Chinese School is located in Palo Alto, and has classes teaching both Mandarin and Cantonese. The Shoong Family Chinese Cultural Center in Oakland serves as the premier Chinese-language school in the East Area, and Contra Costa Chinese School is located in Pleasant Hill.
 The North Valley Chinese School in Milpitas and San Jose Chinese school both serve the greater San Jose area.
 The Redwood Empire Chinese Center's Chinese school in Santa Rosa serves the North Bay.

Media
The New York-based but worldwide-distributed newspaper Epoch Times (大紀元時報) has a branch office in San Francisco. The Hong Kong-based newspaper Sing Tao Daily (星島日報) has an office in San Francisco. East West, The Chinese American Journal folded in 1989. The Chinese-American newspaper World Journal (世界日報) has an office in Millbrae.

KTSF serves as a Chinese-language television broadcast station.

Transportation

Previously the Taiwanese airline China Airlines operated a bus to San Francisco International Airport from Milpitas and Cupertino in California.

Cultural events
The Chinese New Year Parade in San Francisco is held on every Chinese New Year's, and is celebrated in Chinatown. It is the largest Chinese New Year event in North America. The Taiwanese American Cultural Festival, started in 1993, is held in Union Square, San Francisco every May.

Notable people

 Francis Chan, preacher 
 Raymond Chow Kwok Cheung, criminal
 Carmen Chu, politician
 Sandra Lee Fewer, politician
 Edsel Ford Fong, waiter at Sam Wo
 Heather Fong, former Chief of San Francisco Police Department 
 Alex Gong, kickboxer 
 Ed Jew, politician 
 Fred Lau, former Chief of San Francisco Police Department
 Bruce Lee, actor, born in Chinatown
 Ed Lee, former Mayor of San Francisco
 Walter U. Lum, activist
 Eric Mar, politician
 Gordon Mar, politician
 Betty Ong, American Airlines Flight 11 flight attendant
 Rose Pak, community organizer
 Amy Tan, author
 Katy Tang, politician
 Phil Ting, politician
 Alex Tse, screenwriter
 Ali Wong, comedian
 Martin Wong, artist
 Willie "Woo Woo" Wong, basketball player, who a playground in Chinatown is named after
 Leland Yee, politician
 Norman Yee, politician

References

Further reading
 Chen, Yong. Chinese San Francisco, 1850–1943: A Trans-Pacific Community. Stanford University Press, 2002. , 9780804745505.
  - PhD thesis
 Isaacs, Sally Senzell. Life in San Francisco's Chinatown. Heinemann Library, 2003. , 9781403405241.
 Jorae, Wendy Rouse. Children of Chinatown: Growing Up Chinese American in San Francisco, 1850–1920: Growing Up Chinese American in San Francisco, 1850–1920. University of North Carolina Press, 2009. , 9780807898581.
 Lim, Roger T. The Chinese in San Francisco and the Mining Region of California, 1848–1858. Dominican College of San Rafael, 1979.
 Shah, Nayan. Contagious Divides: Epidemics and Race in San Francisco's Chinatown (Volume 7 of American crossroads). University of California Press, 2001. , 9780520226296.
 Tong, Benson. Unsubmissive Women: Chinese Prostitutes in Nineteenth Century San Francisco. University of Oklahoma Press, August 1, 2000. , 9780806132846.
 Yung, Judy. Unbound Feet: A Social History of Chinese Women in San Francisco. University of California Press, 1995. , 9780520915350.
 Yung, Judy (editor). Unbound Voices: A Documentary History of Chinese Women in San Francisco. University of California Press, 1999. , 9780520922877.

External links
 Chinese American Voters Education Committee (CAVEC; 華裔選民教育委員會 Huáyì Xuǎnmín Jiàoyùwěiyuánhuì)

Chinese
History of San Francisco
 
Chinese-American history